Harry Bridges (28 July 1901 – 30 March 1990) was an Australian-born American union leader, first with the International Longshoremen's Association (ILA). In 1937, he led several chapters in forming a new union, the International Longshore and Warehouse Union (ILWU), expanding members to workers in warehouses, and led it for the next 40 years. He was prosecuted for his labor organizing and designated as subversive by the U.S. government during the 1930s, 1940s, and 1950s, with the goal of deportation. This was never achieved.

Bridges became a naturalized citizen in 1945. His conviction by a federal jury for having lied about his Communist Party membership when seeking naturalization was overturned by the Supreme Court in 1953 as having been prosecuted untimely, outside the statute of limitations. His official power was reduced when the ILWU was expelled by the CIO in 1950, but he continued to be re-elected by the membership and was highly influential until his retirement in 1977.

Background
Bridges was born Alfred Renton Bryant Bridges in Kensington, Victoria, Australia.

Career
Bridges went to sea at age 16 as a merchant seaman and joined the Australian sailors' union. Inspired by Jack London to take to the sea, he took the name Harry from an uncle, who was a socialist and an adventurer. Bridges entered the United States in 1920, where his American colleagues gave him several nicknames, including "The Beak" for his prominent nose, "The Limey," as they couldn't tell the difference between an Australian and an Englishman, "Australian Harry," and "Racehorse Harry" for his love of horse racing.

In 1921, Bridges joined the Industrial Workers of the World (IWW), participating in an unsuccessful nationwide seamen's strike. While Bridges left the IWW shortly thereafter with doubts about the organization, his early experiences in the IWW and in Australian unions influenced his beliefs on militant unionism, based on rank and file power and involvement.

Bridges left the sea for longshore work in San Francisco in 1922. The shipowners had created a company union after the International Longshoremen's Association local in San Francisco was destroyed by a strike it lost in 1919. Bridges resisted joining that union, finding casual work on the docks as a "pirate". After he joined the San Francisco local of the ILA and participated in a Labor Day parade in 1924, he was blacklisted for several years. Bridges eventually joined the company union in 1927 and worked as a winch operator and rigger on a steel-handling gang.

Albion Hall group
The ILA renewed its efforts to reestablish itself on the West Coast, chartering a new local in San Francisco in 1933. With the passage that year of the National Industrial Recovery Act, which contained some encouraging but unenforceable provisions declaring that workers had the right to organize unions of their own choice, thousands of longshoremen joined the new ILA local.

At the time Bridges was a member of a circle of longshoremen that came to be known as the "Albion Hall Group", after their meeting place. It attracted members from a variety of backgrounds: members of the Communist Party, which was then trying to organize all longshoremen, sailors and other maritime workers into the Marine Workers Industrial Union (MWIU), as a revolutionary, industry-wide alternative to the ILA and other American Federation of Labor (AFL) unions; former IWW members, and others with no clearly defined politics.

This group had acquired some influence on the docks through its publication The Waterfront Worker, a mimeographed sheet sold for a penny that published articles written by longshoremen and seamen, almost always under pseudonyms. These articles focused on workers' day-to-day concerns: the pace of work, the weight of loads, abusive bosses, and unsafe working conditions. While the first editions were published in the apartment of an MWIU member on a second-hand mimeograph machine, the paper remained independent of both the party and the MWIU.

Although Bridges was sympathetic to much of the MWIU's program in 1933, he chose to join the new ILA local. When the local held elections, Bridges and fellow members of the Albion Hall group made up a majority of the executive board and held two of the three business agents positions.

The Albion Hall Group stressed the self-help tactics of syndicalism, urging workers to organize by taking part in strikes and slowdowns, rather than depending on governmental assistance under the NIRA. It also campaigned for membership participation in the new ILA local, which had not bothered to hold any membership meetings. Finally, the group started laying the groundwork for organizing on a coastwide basis, meeting with activists from Portland, Oregon and Seattle, Washington and organizing a federation of all of the different unions that represented maritime workers.

Under Bridges' leadership, the group organized a successful 5-day strike in October 1933 to force Matson Navigation Company to reinstate four longshoremen it had fired for wearing ILA buttons on the job. Longshoremen at other ports threatened to refuse to handle Matson cargo unless the company rehired the four men.

1934 West Coast Longshore Strike

Early in 1934, Bridges and the Albion Hall group and militants in other ports began planning a coast-wide strike. The Roosevelt administration tried to head off the strike by appointing a mediation board to oversee negotiations, but neither side accepted its proposed compromise. Bridges was elected chairman of the strike committee. The strike began on 9 May. While the elected local officers were the nominal leaders of the strike at its outset, Bridges led the planning of the strike along with his friend Sam Kagel. They recruited rank-and-file opposition to the two proposed contracts that the leadership negotiated and the membership rejected during the strike, and the dealings with other unions during related events.

A four-day San Francisco General strike took place after "Bloody Thursday" on 5 July, when police aided the Waterfront Employers Association in trucking cargo from the pierheads to the warehouses through the union's picket line. Scores of strikers were beaten or wounded by gunfire during the battle. During a coordinated raid on the union mess hall at the corner of Steuart and Mission, San Francisco Police shot and killed Howard Sperry, a striking sailor, and Nick Counderakis (AKA Nick Bordoise), member of the cook's union and a strike sympathizer helping out at the mess hall. Scores of other men were wounded by police gunfire as well, including a number of bystanders, as the ensuing battle quickly spilled into the nearby downtown area.

Bridges became the chief spokesperson for the union in negotiations after workers rejected the second agreement negotiated by the old leadership in June. Bridges did not control the strike: over his strong objections, the ILA membership voted to accept arbitration to end the strike. Similarly, in 1935 Bridges' opposition did not stop the ILA leadership from extending the union's contract with the employers, rather than striking in solidarity with the seamen.

Growth and independence

Bridges was elected president of the San Francisco local in 1934 and president of the Pacific Coast District of the ILA in 1936. During this period the ILA commenced "the March Inland", in which it organized the many warehouses, both in the ports and those at a distance from them, which received the goods that longshoremen handled. Bridges led efforts to form Maritime Federation of the Pacific, which brought all of the maritime unions together for common action. That federation helped the sailors union win the same sort of contract after a long strike in 1936 that the ILA had achieved in 1934.

In 1937, the Pacific Coast district, with the exception of three locals in the Northwest, formally seceded from the ILA, renaming itself as the International Longshoremen's and Warehousemen's Union, after the ILA tried to reorganize the existing locals, abandon representation of warehousemen, and reverse the unions' policies on issues such as unemployment insurance.

Bridges was elected president of the new union, which quickly affiliated with the Congress of Industrial Organizations (CIO). Bridges became the West Coast Director for the CIO shortly thereafter.

The ILWU also established strong unions on the docks in Hawai'i during this time, and later among sugar and pineapple workers there. It encountered the concerted opposition of the employers, the military and most of the political establishment but the ILWU's work changed the political climate in Hawai'i. It broke the hold on power that the white landed elite had exercised for half a century.

As a measure of his influence, Bridges was featured on the cover of Time magazine on 19 July 1937.

Legal battles

In mid-July 1939, hearings took place at the Angel Island Immigration Station to deport Bridges.  Government witnesses included Major Lawrence Milner and ex-communist official John Lewis Leech.  While Leech held fast to his testimony, Milner confessed to perjury, for which the Bridges defense team demanded indictment. The hearings found Bridges did not qualify for deportation because he was not currently—as the Alien Act of 1918 required—a member of or affiliated with an organization that advocated the overthrow of the government. Because of this, the Smith Act of 1940 was written so that federal authorities could deport him. It allowed deportation of an alien who was a member or affiliated "at any time" since arriving in the U.S. with such an organization advocating overthrow of the government. A second round of deportation hearings ended after ten weeks in June 1941.<ref>Steele, "Free Speech, 105, 107-9</ref> In September, the special examiner who led the hearings recommended deportation, but the Board of Immigration Appeals (BIA) reversed that order after finding the government's two key witnesses to be unreliable. In May 1942, though the Roosevelt administration was now putting its anti-Communist activities on hold in the interest of furthering the Soviet-American alliance, Attorney General Biddle overruled the BIA and ordered Bridges be deported. Bridges appealed and lost in District Court and the Court of Appeals. But the Supreme Court overruled deportation, holding 5–3 on June 18, 1945, in the case of Bridges v. Wixon, that the government had not proven Bridges was "affiliated" with the CPUSA, a word it interpreted to require more than "sympathy" or "mere cooperation".

Bridges became a naturalized U.S. citizen in 1945. With the goal of deportation, in 1948 the federal government tried Bridges for fraud and perjury, for denying when applying for naturalization that he had ever been a member of the Communist Party. The jury convicted Bridges and two co-defendants. He was sentenced to five years in prison and his citizenship was revoked. The Supreme Court in a 5-3 decision overturned the conviction in 1953 because the indictment on fraud and perjury charges did not occur within the three years set by the statute of limitations. The government dropped the criminal charges and pursued a case in civil court in June and July 1955, hoping to overturn Bridges' naturalization because it had been obtained by fraud. The trial judge ruled in Bridges' favor and the government did not appeal.

Political battles

Bridges hewed to the Communist Party line throughout the late 1930s and 1940s. After the Molotov-Ribbentrop pact was signed in 1939, the party attacked Roosevelt and Churchill as warmongers and adopted the slogan "The Yanks Ain't Coming." Bridges denounced President Roosevelt for betraying labor and preparing for war. John L. Lewis, the head of the CIO, responded in October 1939 by abolishing the position of West Coast director of the CIO, limiting Bridges' authority to California.

Bridges continued opposing the Roosevelt Administration, belittling the New Deal and urging union voters to withhold their support from Roosevelt. He said they should wait to see what Lewis, who had now also split with the Roosevelt administration, recommended. That position proved highly unpopular with the membership; many locals had already endorsed FDR for a third term and several locals passed motions calling for Bridges to resign. He refused, noting that the union's constitution allowed for a recall election if fifteen percent of the membership petitioned for one. The ILWU executive board gave him a vote of confidence.

After Germany attacked the Soviet Union in June 1941, Bridges urged employers to increase productivity in order to prepare for war. When the CIO later adopted a wartime no-strike pledge, Bridges supported the pledge. He proposed at the high point of the Communist Party's enthusiasm for unity—immediately after the Teheran Conference in 1943—that the pledge continue after the end of the war. The ILWU not only condemned the Retail, Wholesale Department Store Employees union for striking Montgomery Ward in 1943—after management refused to sign a new contract, cut wages, and fired union activists—but also assisted it in breaking the strike, by ordering members in St. Paul, Minnesota to work overtime, to handle overflow from the struck Chicago plant.

Bridges also called for a speedup of the pace of work—which may not have been inconsistent with the ILWU's goal of controlling the way that work was done on the docks. It had struggled with employers on this issue and the speedup was rejected by many ILWU members. Bridges later joined with Joseph Curran of the National Maritime Union, which represented sailors on the East Coast, and Julius Emspak of the United Electrical, Radio and Machine Workers of America, to support a proposal by Roosevelt in 1944, to militarize some civilian workplaces.

Bridges' attitude changed sharply after the end of World War II. While he still advocated the post-war plan for industrial peace that the Communist Party, along with the leaders of the CIO, the AFL and the Chamber of Commerce, were advocating, he differed sharply with CIO leadership on Cold War politics. He had his own opinions about the Marshall Plan and the application of the Truman Doctrine in Greece and Turkey, as well as participation in the World Federation of Trade Unions, viewing every element from the point of how it would affect his constituents.

Those foreign policy issues became labor issues for the ILWU in 1948, when the employers claimed that the union was preparing to strike in order to cripple the Marshall Plan. Emboldened by the new provisions of the Taft-Hartley Act, which required union officers to sign an oath that they were not members of the Communist Party, outlawed the closed shop, and gave the President authority to seek an 80-day "cooling off" period before a strike that would imperil the national health or safety, the employers pushed for a strike. They hoped to rid themselves of Bridges and reclaim control over the hiring hall. As it turned out, their strategy was a failure. The employer group reached a new agreement with the union after replacing their bargaining representatives and enduring a ninety-five-day strike.

At the same time, Philip Murray, Lewis' successor as head of the CIO, had started reducing Bridges' power within the CIO, removing him from his position as the CIO's California Regional Director in 1948. In 1950, after an internal trial, the CIO expelled the ILWU due to its communist leadership.

Coping with change

Expulsion had no real effect, however, on either the ILWU or Bridges' power within it. The organization continued to negotiate agreements, with less strife than in the 1930s and 1940s, and Bridges continued to be reelected without serious opposition. The union negotiated a groundbreaking agreement in 1960, that permitted the extensive mechanization of the docks. Its leadership agreed to significantly reducing the number of longshore workers in return for generous job guarantees and benefits for those displaced by the changes.

The agreement, however, highlighted the lesser status of less senior members, known as "B-men." Bridges reacted defensively to these workers' complaints, which had additional sting because many of the "B-men" were black and had worked hard to enter the union. The additional longshore work produced by the Vietnam War allowed Bridges to meet the challenge by opening up more jobs and making determined efforts to recruit black applicants. The ILWU later faced similar challenges from women, who found it even harder to enter the industry and the union.

Bridges had difficulty giving up his position in the ILWU. He explored the possibility of merging it with the ILA or the Teamsters in the early 1970s. He retired in 1977 after ensuring that Louis Goldblatt, the long-time Secretary-Treasurer of the union and his logical successor, was denied the opportunity to replace him. He opposed Goldblatt. 

On 28 July 2001, on what would have been Bridges' 100th birthday, the ILWU organized a week-long event celebrating the life of the union leader. This culminated in a march of more than 8000 unionists and supporters across the Vincent Thomas Bridge from Terminal Island to San Pedro, California. The longshoremen shut down the port for eight hours in honor of Bridges.

Personal life and death

Bridges divorced his second wife, Nancy Fenton Berdicio Bridges, a onetime professional dancer, after eight years of marriage. They had two children.

Bridges met Noriko Sawada in San Francisco, when introduced by her employer, Charles Garry, a civil rights lawyer. They were attending a fund-raiser for mine, mill, and smelter workers. The two later became a couple. In 1958, the couple decided to marry in Reno, Nevada. At the county courthouse, the clerk refused the couple a marriage license because Sawada was ethnic Japanese and Nevada had an 1846 statute banning marriage between any white person and "any person of the Ethiopian or black race, Malay or brown race, Mongolian or yellow race, or American Indian, or red race." Bridges and Sawada asked the Federal District Court to order the marriage license be issued. Judge Taylor Wines granted the order and the couple married 10 December 1958. This order prompted the Nevada legislature to repeal the state's anti-miscegenation laws on 17 March 1959.

Harry Bridges died aged 88 on 30 March 1990.

Legacy

The ILWU headquarters in San Francisco is called the Harry R. Bridges Memorial Building.

On the West Coast, Bridges still excites passions both for and against the labor movement.

The Harry Bridges Institute in San Pedro, California, is a research institute that focuses on topics of international economics and how changes in political geography affect unions. The archives of the Harry Bridges Institute are held in the University Library at California State University, Northridge.  The Harry Bridges Center for Labor Studies at the University of Washington (UW) in Seattle, Washington, was established in Bridges' honor in 1992 by ILWU past and current ILWU members. The center supports research, teaching, and community outreach by UW faculty and students and labor organizations.

Harry Bridges Span School, in the harbor town of Wilmington, California, is named after him, as is Harry Bridges Blvd (also in Wilmington), which runs along the north side of the Port of Los Angeles.

In 1941, The Almanac Singers, including Woody Guthrie and Pete Seeger, recorded "Song for Bridges" while working on their album Talking Union that defends Bridges' work.  In 1994, Rancid, a band from Oakland, California, released a song titled "Harry Bridges" on their album Let's Go following their song "Union Blood" on their 1993 Rancid.

California Governor Gray Davis declared 28 July 2001, Bridges' 100th birthday, as "Harry Bridges Day." On the same day, the City of San Francisco dedicated a plaza in Bridges' honor.

In 2009, the nonprofit Harry Bridges Project produced From Wharf Rats to Lords of the Docks: The Life and Times of Harry Bridges, a one-man play that was directed and filmed by Haskell Wexler. It promotes Bridges' legacy and the influence of his work. The film was broadcast on some PBS stations on Labor Day Weekend in 2009.

In 2010, the Long Beach City Council renamed the Queen Mary Events Park to the Harry Bridges Memorial Park.

In a 2023 biography of Bridges, Professor Emeritus Robert W. Cherny concluded that Bridges had not been a CPUSA member based on careful checks against multiple contemporary sources, however much Bridges agreed with various aspects of Marxism or extolled the USSR.  Instead, he found that Bridges was one of a few people "listened to, consulted with, offered advice, and asked for advice, but were not given directions and were not under party discipline".

References

Further reading
Howard Kimeldorf, Reds or Rackets, The Making of Radical and Conservative Unions on the Waterfront, 
Charles Larrowe, Harry Bridges, The Rise and Fall of Radical Labor in the U.S., 
Bruce Nelson, Workers on the Waterfront, Seamen, Longshoremen and Unionism in the 1930s, 
Ward, Estolv Ethan, Harry Bridges on Trial (available at the Internet Archive)
Robert W. Cherny, Harry Bridges, Labor Radical, Labor Legend'',  ISBN 9780252044748

Archives
 Robert Duggan Papers. 1989–1992. 5 cubic feet (5 boxes). Contains records from Duggan's work of creating the Bridge's Chair in 1992. At the Labor Archives of Washington, University of Washington Libraries Special Collections. 
 Raymond L. McAndrew Papers. 1934–1972. 2.5" liner. Contains some writings by Harry Bridges. At the Labor Archives of Washington, University of Washington Libraries Special Collections.
 Harry Bridges Center for Labor Studies Union Charters Collection. 1903–1966. 0.06 cubic feet (1 oversize box). At the Labor Archives of Washington, University of Washington Libraries Special Collections. 
 Ronald Magden Papers. 1879–2003. 28.27 cubic feet (34 boxes). Contains various writings and materials about Harry Bridges. At the Labor Archives of Washington, University of Washington Libraries Special Collections.
 David Olson Papers. 1915–2008. 6.06 cubic feet (6 boxes and one oversized folder). Contains materials related to the founding of Harry Bridges Chair of Labor Studies at the University of Washington. At the Labor Archives of Washington, University of Washington Libraries Special Collections.
 George E. Rennar Papers. 1933–1972. 37.43 cubic feet. Contains ephemera on the Harry Bridges Victory Committee. At the Labor Archives of Washington, University of Washington Libraries Special Collections.
 John Caughlan Papers. 1933–2003. 54.44 cubic feet (84 boxes, 3 oversize folders, 2 vertical files.). Contains bound volume of ILWU newsletters from 1949 to 1955. At the Labor Archives of Washington, University of Washington Libraries Special Collections.
 Anne Rand Library, International Longshore and Warehouse Union. Contains a digitized collection of archival news sources related to the ILWU, Pacific Coast Maritime Labor, and Harry Bridges.

External links

ILWU Local 19: Harry Bridges A Biography, accessed 23 June 2012
Harry Bridges: Life and Legacy, a multimedia section of the Waterfront Workers History Project
Speech delivered by Harry Bridges to the Comstock Club of Sacramento, California on June 6, 1967

American trade union leaders
Australian emigrants to the United States
Industrial Workers of the World members
Activists from San Francisco
Trade unionists from California
Trade unionists from Melbourne
Australian trade unionists
1901 births
1990 deaths
International Longshore and Warehouse Union people
Naturalized citizens of the United States
Australian waterside workers
Australian sailors
Members of the Communist Party USA
Australian communists
People from Kensington, Victoria